Cheshmeh-ye Hajji Mohammad (also Romanized as Cheshmeh-ye Ḩājjī Moḩammad and Cheshmeh-ye Ḩājj Moḩammad) is a village in Kakavand-e Sharqi Rural District, Kakavand District, Delfan County, Lorestan Province, Iran. At the 2006 census, its population was 87, in 21 families.

References 

Towns and villages in Delfan County